The 2013 Rochester Rattlers season is the 11th season for the Rochester Rattlers of Major League Lacrosse and third since the Chicago Machine rebranded themselves as the Rattlers after the original franchise relocated to Toronto. The Rattlers will try to improve upon their 7–7 record in 2012, which was not good enough to clinch a playoff spot.

Standings

External links
 Team Website

2013 in lacrosse
2013 in American sports
2013 in sports in New York (state)